Sandy Meredith (born 15 July 1962) is a former American rugby union player. She was a member of the  squad that won the inaugural 1991 Women's Rugby World Cup in Wales.

In 2017 Meredith and the 1991 World Cup squad were inducted into the United States Rugby Hall of Fame.

References 

Living people
1962 births
Female rugby union players
American female rugby union players
United States women's international rugby union players